Pseudochorthippus montanus (often known by its synonym Chorthippus montanus) is a species belonging to the family Acrididae,  tribe Gomphocerini.  It is found across the Palearctic. In Europe, the northern distribution border passes through northern France, the Benelux countries and northern Scandinavia. The south boundary is the Pyrenees and French Central Massif, the south edge of the central Alps, the Apennines to in the northern part of the Balkan Peninsula and from Romania to Mongolia and Manchuria . The species is widespread in Central and Eastern Europe, even at low altitudes. It occurs in the Alps 370–2480 meters above sea level on. In Asia, the range extends to Siberia extends north to Verkhoyansk, the Altai and Kamchatka.

References

montanus
Orthoptera of Europe
Insects described in 1825